is a Japanese actor and theatre director. He is currently affiliated with Horipro.

Biography
Yoshida spent six years in Osaka during his grade school days, and later grew up in Hino, Tokyo. While a student at St. Paul High School, he saw the Shakespearean comedy "Twelfth Night" by the Kumo Theater Company and decided to become an actor. While studying at the Department of German Literature in the Faculty of Literature at Sophia University, he made his debut by performing Twelfth Night in the Shakespeare Study Group. He later dropped out of the same university.

After working with the Shiki Theatre Company for six months, he worked with Shakespeare Theatre, Lyming Theatre Company, and Tokyo Ichigumi before forming Performance Unit AUN with director Yoshihiro Kurita in 1997, which he also directed. He was valued as an actor capable of performing the roles required of foreign classics such as Shakespeare and Greek tragedies, and was a regular in Yukio Ninagawa's productions. He is a close friend of Tatsuya Fujiwara and Shun Oguri, who often appeared in Ninagawa's works. Starting in 2010, he expanded his activities into television dramas and films on the advice of Oguri.

Yoshida played Hanzawa's boss in Hanzawa Naoki in 2013 and Densuke Kanō, who was modeled after businessman Den'emon Itō, in Hanako to Anne in 2014. These performances attracted attention, which led to an increase in his appearances in films, his first starring role being in Tokyo Sentimental.

He got married on January 1, 2016 (his fourth marriage, including one de facto marriage) and hosted a wedding in February 2017. In October 2016, he succeeded Yukio Ninagawa as the second artistic director of the Sai no Kuni Shakespeare Series.

Filmography

Stage

Film

Television

Awards

References

External links
 
Kōtarō Yoshida on NHK Archives 

Japanese male film actors
Japanese male stage actors
Japanese male television actors
Japanese male voice actors
Japanese theatre directors
1959 births
Living people
Male actors from Tokyo
Horipro artists
20th-century Japanese male actors
21st-century Japanese male actors